The Iranian pragmatists are a political faction in Iran composed of moderate clerics and the merchant elite that see the Islamic Republic as a mean to retain power. The pragmatic faction is receptive to negotiate with the West and many would prefer a socialist market economy rather than closed markets.

Notable pragmatists
 Akbar Hashemi Rafsanjani
 Hassan Khomeini
 Hassan Rouhani

Notes

References

Bibliography
 

Pragmatists